Michal Kasal (born 3 April 1994) is a Czech handball player for Elbflorenz Dresden and the Czech national team.

References

1994 births
Living people
Czech male handball players
Expatriate handball players
Czech expatriate sportspeople in Slovakia
Czech expatriate sportspeople in Slovenia
Czech expatriate sportspeople in Spain
Liga ASOBAL players
BM Granollers players
FC Barcelona Handbol players
People from Nové Město na Moravě
Sportspeople from the Vysočina Region
Czech expatriate sportspeople in Germany
Czech expatriate sportspeople in Portugal
Czech expatriate sportspeople in France